Leoni is an Italian surname.

Leoni may also refer to:

Places 
Porta Leoni, an ancient Roman gate in Verona, northern Italy
Puerto Leoni, a municipality in Misiones Province in north-eastern Argentina
Leoni Township, Michigan
Leoni (Bavaria) (formerly Assenbuch) in Bavaria

Buildings 
Palazzo Leoni, Bologna, Renaissance style palace, in central Bologna, Italy
Palazzo Marcello dei Leoni, between the Rio di San Tomà e Palazzo Dolfin, in the sestiere di San Polo, Venice, Italy
Palazzo Leoni Montanari, Vicenza, late Baroque palace located in Contra’ San Corona in central Vicenza, Italy

Other uses 
Leoni (film)
Leoni Leo, 1917 Hungarian adventure film directed by Alfréd Deésy 
"Leoni", the standard setting for the hymn The God of Abraham Praise
Leoni Cables, formerly Leonische Drahtwerke, cable firm from Germany

See also 
Leone (disambiguation)